Edward Coleman (5 September 1891 – 2 April 1917) was an English cricketer. He played for Essex between 1911 and 1912. He was killed in action during World War I.

References

External links

1891 births
1917 deaths
Military personnel from Southend-on-Sea
British military personnel of World War I
British military personnel killed in World War I
English cricketers
Essex cricketers
Sportspeople from Southend-on-Sea
Oxford and Cambridge Universities cricketers